CCR4-NOT transcription complex subunit 3 is a protein that in humans is encoded by the CNOT3 gene. It is a subunit of the CCR4-Not deadenylase complex.

Interactions 

CNOT3 has been shown to interact with CNOT8.

References

Further reading

External links